The Centre–Kentucky rivalry was an intercollegiate sports rivalry between Centre College in Danville, Kentucky and the University of Kentucky in Lexington, Kentucky. The two school first met in football in 1891 and basketball in 1906. The two rivals last played in 1929 in both sports.

Football

Football series
Game in 1918 cancelled due to flu epidemic. Kentucky is known as Kentucky State College before 1913. Centre merges with Central in 1901.

Basketball
Starting in 1906, Kentucky won the first three games but only before Centre College did the same, tying the series at 3. For the next three games Kentucky and Centre traded wins and the series lead, until Centre went on a five-game winning streak to break the tie.

The series was put on hold in 1910 and resumed in 1912 with Kentucky winning both games that year. The series was again put on hold for the 1913 and 1914 seasons. The next year the two met in Danville, with the result being the same, Kentucky blowing out Centre 38–5. Kentucky would win the next three games and extend their win streak to five, tying Centre's longest streak. The streak was snapped at five when Centre beat Kentucky twice in the next three games.

Starting in 1918 it was Centre's turn to dominate once again. The Colonels would rally of six straight wins over the Wildcats, once again taking the series lead over Kentucky. Kentucky would bounce back and win three straight games, but Centre responded by winning the following two. These two wins would be Centre's last against Kentucky.

Going into the '20s Kentucky held a losing record of 15–11 to their rival. Kentucky however was shedding its label as a struggling program under Coach Buncheit and later Coach Mauer. Kentucky would defeat Centre in every game after 1924, carrying their win streak to a total of 11 by the end of the series in 1930. The same year Coach Rupp would take the coaching job after John Mauer.

Basketball series

See also  
 List of NCAA college football rivalry games

References

http://www.bigbluehistory.net/bb/rivalCentreCollege.html
http://www.bigbluehistory.net/bb/Statistics/CentreCollege.html

College basketball rivalries in the United States
College football rivalries in the United States
Kentucky Wildcats men's basketball
Centre Colonels
Dissolved sports rivalries
1891 establishments in Kentucky